Commander John Lamb (1790 – 17 January 1862) was an English-born Australian naval officer, banker and politician. The son of Captain Edward Lamb of the East India Company and Eliza Buchanan, Lamb was appointed to the New South Wales Legislative Council on 10 September 1844. He had a distinguished career with the Royal Navy,  beginning at age 11 on his uncle Captain William Buchanan's British Navy warship, the Leviathan. Lamb was noted for his role in several feats over the French and accepted the rank of retired naval commander in May 1846.

Commander Lamb founded a banking family in Australia as chairman of the Commercial Banking Company of Sydney (now National Australia Bank). Four of his sons also became CBCS directors, namely the bankers and politicians Walter Lamb, Alfred Lamb, Edward Lamb and the banker John de Villiers Lamb. His wife Emma (née Robinson) was the daughter of the deputy chairman of Lloyds Bank. His daughter-in-law by John Lamb, Henrietta Lamb, was the sister of the deputy chairman of the Commercial Banking Company of Sydney, Thomas Smith.

Early life
He was born in Penrith, England, the son of Captain Edward Lamb of the East India Company and Eliza Buchanan. At the age of 11 he joined the Royal Navy as a midshipman, rising to the rank of lieutenant by 1808.

With a grant from the Royal Navy's Patriotic Fund for distinguished service, Commander Lamb and his Buchanan cousins formed the merchant banking house of Lamb, Buchanan & Co. He was in charge of convict transport and merchant ships between 1815 and 1828. In March 1823 he married Emma (née Robinson), daughter of the deputy chairman of Lloyds Bank; they would have fourteen children.

He settled in Sydney in 1829, and ran a woollen brokers and shipping agents merchant banking firm. He was a strong opponent of continued convict transportation and a member of the Anti-Transportation League. He was chosen by Governor William Bligh to transport him to New South Wales.

Career

Lamb's partnership with Buchanan ended in 1834 and he renewed his merchant banking business as Lamb & Co. He became a director of many large public companies, including the Sydney Alliance Assurance Co., the Australian Fire and Life Assurance Co. and the Sydney Railroad Co. He was a director and several times chairman of the Commercial Banking Co. of Sydney in 1834–50. In 1851-52 he was a founder and first chairman of the Sydney Chamber of Commerce and of the Sydney Exchange Co.

He was appointed to the New South Wales Legislative Council on 10 September 1844. In 1851 the number of members in the Council was increased from to 54, 18 to be appointed and 36 elected. At the 1851 New South Wales colonial election, Lamb was elected as one of three members for the City of Sydney. He resigned in February 1853. He was again appointed to the Legislative Council in July 1857, for the balance of a five-year term ending on 10 May 1861.

Further details

Lamb married Emma (née Robinson), the daughter of John Robinson of Holloway, a London banker and deputy chairman of Lloyds Bank. Lamb died at Darlinghurst on 17 January 1862. He was interred St Judes Cemetery, Randwick, NSW. His sons were the bankers and politicians Walter Lamb, Alfred Lamb, Edward Lamb and the banker John de Villiers Lamb, all of whom held rank as directors of the Commercial Banking Company of Sydney (now NAB). His daughter-in-law by John de Villiers, Henrietta Octavia Lamb, was the sister of the deputy chairman and managing director of the Commercial Banking Company of Sydney, Thomas Whistler Smith, in turn the brother-in-law of John Street, founder of the Street dynasty.

References

 

1790 births
1862 deaths
Members of the New South Wales Legislative Council
English emigrants to colonial Australia
19th-century Australian politicians